The following is a list of films banned in the Philippines. This list includes films which were banned for public screening in the Philippines by law by virtue of being given an "X" or "Banned" rating or by being deemed "not fit for public exhibition" by the Movie and Television Review and Classification Board (MTRCB).

List

Feature films

Short films

See also

 Cinema of the Philippines
 Censorship in the Philippines

References

Philippines
Films

Banned